"Boom, Like That" is a 2004 single by Mark Knopfler, from his album Shangri-La. It is – with "Darling Pretty" – one of only two Mark Knopfler solo singles to reach the UK Top 40, hitting no. 34.

Lyrics
The subject of the song is Ray Kroc, the McDonald's entrepreneur. Knopfler indicated that he was inspired by Kroc's autobiography.

Track listings

CD single
"Boom, Like That"
"Summer of Love"

Maxi CD single
"Boom, Like That"
"Summer of Love"
"Who's Your Baby Now" (live)

7"
"Boom, Like That"
"Who's Your Baby Now" (live)

References 

 

2004 singles
Mark Knopfler songs
Songs written by Mark Knopfler
Song recordings produced by Mark Knopfler
2004 songs
Mercury Records singles
McDonald's